Events from the year 1563 in art.

Events
January 13 – The Accademia e Compagnia delle Arti del Disegno ("Academy and company of the arts of drawing") is established in Florence by Cosimo I de' Medici, Grand Duke of Tuscany, under the influence of Giorgio Vasari. 
December 4 – The Council of Trent issues a decree on the proper function of Roman Catholic art. 
date unknown - The Medici court astronomer Fra Ignazio Danti paints 57 maps at the Palazzo Vecchio in Florence.

Paintings

 Giuseppe Arcimboldo paints his first The Four Seasons series.
 Pieter Brueghel the Elder paints Adoration of the Magi in a Winter Landscape, Landscape with the Flight into Egypt and The Tower of Babel.
 Niccolò Circignani paints the Concert in the Government Room of the Città della Pieve in Umbria.
 Lucas de Heere paints a portrait of Mary, Queen of Scots.
 Giovanni Battista Moroni paints The Count Pietro Secco Suardo.
 Francesco Primaticcio paints Odysseus and Penelope.
 Bernaert de Rijckere paints a  portrait diptych of Antwerp merchant Adriaan van Santvoort and his family.
 Paolo Veronese completes painting The Wedding at Cana (1562-1563).

Births
June 4 - George Heriot, Scottish goldsmith, jeweler and philanthropist (died 1624)
date unknown
Grazio Cossali, Italian painter (died 1629)
Ercole dell'Abate, Italian painter (died 1618)
Benedetto Gennari, Italian painter of the early-Baroque period (died 1610)
Orazio Gentileschi, Italian Baroque Caravaggisti painter (died 1639)
Anton Möller, Polish painter (died 1611)
Heo Nanseolheon, Korean poet and painter (died 1589)
Francesco Vanni, Italian mannerist painter (died 1610)

Deaths
October 22 - Diego Siloe, Spanish Renaissance architect and sculptor (born 1490)
date unknown - Andrea Schiavone, Venetian Renaissance etcher and painter (born 1510/1515)

 
Years of the 16th century in art